Admiral Berry may refer to:

Edward Berry (1768–1831), British Royal Navy rear admiral
John Berry (Royal Navy officer) (1635–1689 or 1690), British Royal Navy admiral
Suraj Berry (fl. 1980s–2020s), Indian Navy vice admiral